Portrait of Sir Thomas More is an oak panel painting commissioned in 1527 of Thomas More by the German artist and printmaker Hans Holbein the Younger, now in the Frick Collection in New York.

The work was created during the period from 1526 when Holbein lived in London. He gained the friendship of the Dutch humanist Desiderius Erasmus, who recommended that he befriend More, then a powerful, knighted speaker at the English Parliament.

A closely related, though probably not directly preparatory, drawing with bodycolour is in the Royal Collection, and there is a copy in the National Portrait Gallery, probably "painted in Italy or Austria in the early seventeenth century".  Possibly this is the version catalogued in the Leuchtenberg Gallery in 1852.

Another Holbein portrait of More, part of a large group portrait of his family, is now lost, but several drawings (also mostly in the Royal Collection) and copies survive.

Notes

Sources
 Bätschmann, Oskar & Griener, Pascal. Hans Holbein. Reaktion Books, 1999. 
 Frick Collection, The Frick Collection: an Illustrated Catalogue, vol. 1 (Paintings), Princeton University Press, Princeton, NJ, 1968, 228–233.

Further reading
 Mantel, Hilary and Salomon, Xavier F., Holbein's Sir Thomas More. The Frick Collection, 2018. 

Portraits of men
Portraits by Hans Holbein the Younger
More
1527 paintings